Lepidiolamprologus is a small genus of cichlids endemic to Lake Tanganyika in eastern Africa. It is closely related to Altolamprologus. and there is the possibility that a revision of the genus could see more species added.

The placement of L. cunningtoni has been questioned, as it seems to be a close relative of N. modestus and the Fourspine Cichlid (N. tetracanthus), though with hybridization running rampant in the Lamprologini, one cannot entirely be sure of its relationships at present. However it differs enough from the other species in Lepidiolamprologus to conclude that it may not belong in this genus.

Species
There are currently eleven recognized species in this genus:
 Lepidiolamprologus attenuatus (Steindachner, 1909)
 Lepidiolamprologus boulengeri  (Steindachner, 1909) 
 Lepidiolamprologus elongatus (Boulenger, 1898)
 Lepidiolamprologus hecqui  (Boulenger, 1899) 
 Lepidiolamprologus kamambae S. O. Kullander, Ma. Karlsson & Mi. Karlsson, 2012
 Lepidiolamprologus kendalli (Poll & D. J. Stewart, 1977)
 Lepidiolamprologus meeli (Poll, 1948) 
 Lepidiolamprologus mimicus Schelly, T. Takahashi, I. R. Bills & M. Hori, 2007
 Lepidiolamprologus profundicola (Poll, 1949)
 Lepidiolamprologus variostigma  (Büscher, 1995)

References

 
Lamprologini

Cichlid genera
Taxa named by Jacques Pellegrin